Abhishek Das (born 4 September 1990) is an Indian cricketer. He played in two first-class and nine Twenty20 matches for Bengal between 2013 and 2016. He made his List A debut on 8 December 2021, for Bengal in the 2021–22 Vijay Hazare Trophy.

See also
 List of Bengal cricketers

References

External links
 

1990 births
Living people
Indian cricketers
Bengal cricketers
People from North 24 Parganas district